Muhamad Arafat bin Varisai Mahamad is a Malaysian politician from PKR. He is the Member of Perak State Legislative Assembly for Hulu Kinta since 2018.

Politics 
He is the Spokesperson of Keadilan Perak and the Chairman of PKR Tambun Branch.

Election results

References 

People's Justice Party (Malaysia) politicians
Members of the Perak State Legislative Assembly
Living people
Year of birth missing (living people)